This is a list of famous Amazigh people. The Amazigh are a transnational North African ethnic group who speak the Amazigh languages.

Royalty and nobility

Ancient period 

Osorkon the Elder, fifth king of the twenty-first dynasty of Ancient Egypt and was the first Pharaoh of Libyan origin
Shoshenq I, Egyptian Pharaoh of Libyan origin, founder of the Twenty-second dynasty of Egypt
Ailymas, Numidian chieftain or King, ally of Agathocles of Syracuse.
Gaia, King of the Massylii (East-Numidia) until 206 BC.
Baga (also Bagas), king of Mauretania (or Maurusia, North Morocco) about 225 BC, ally of Massinissa of Numidia.
Oezalces, King of Numidia for a short time in 206 BC, brother of King Gaia.
Mazaetullus, member of the Massylii royal family. Led a coup to assassinate Capussa and install Lacumazes.
Capussa, son of Oezalces, King of Numidia for a short time in 206 BC, assassinated in a coup.
Lacumazes, youngest son of Oezalces, King of Numidia for a short time in 206 BC, puppet king installed in coup.
Syphax, King of the Masaesyli (West-Numidia) until 203 BC.
Masinissa, King of the Massylii, founder and King of Numidia, in present-day Algeria and Tunisia.
Vermina or Fermina, son of Syphax, King of the Masaesyli.
Archobarzane, son of Vermina, last King of the Masaesyli, led a failed attack against Massinissa.
Micipsa, King of Numidia, son of Massinissa.
Jugurtha, King of Numidia from 118 to 105 BC.
Hiempsal I, King of Numidia, son of Micipsa, assassinated by Jugurtha.
Adherbal, King of Numidia from 118 to 112 BC, son of Micipsa, murdered by Jugurtha.
Bocchus, king of Mauretania about 110 BC until 80 BC.
Volux, son of Bocchus, army leader.
Bogud, son of Bocchus.
Gauda, King of Numidia from 105 to 88 BC, divided the kingdom between his sons upon his death.
Masteabar, petty king of West-Numidia.
Hiempsal II, king of Numidia, son of Gauda, 88 to 60 BC.
Hiarbas, usurper king of Numidia, defeated by Romans to restore Massinissa II on the throne. Died in 82 or 81 BC.
Masinissa II, petty king of West-Numidia (81 to 46 BC), son of Masteabar.
Mastanesosus, king of Mauretania from 80 to 49 BC, son of Bocchus.
Juba I, king of Numidia, 60 to 46 BC, son of Hiempsal II, defeated by Julius Caesar who annexed his kingdom.
Arabio or Arabion, last independent king of Numidia, son of Massinissa II.
Bogud, king of West-Mauretania, son of Mastanesosus, from 49 to 38 BC.
Bocchus II, king of East-Mauretania from 49 to 38 BC, then all of Mauretania until 33 BC. Son of Mastanesosus. Died without leaving heirs.
Juba II, son of Juba I. king of Numidia (30 to 25 BC) and then later moved to Mauretania (25 BC to 23 AD).
Ptolemy of Mauretania, last king of Mauretania (23 to 40 AD).
Macrinus, Roman emperor for 14 months in 217 and 218.
Aemilianus, Roman emperor.
Lusius Quietus, governor of Judaea and one of Trajan's chief generals
Quintus Lollius Urbicus, governor of Britannia from 138 to 144
Gildo, Roman general who turned against the Romans and fought them in 398

Medieval period 

 Dihya, Berber queen, religious and military leader
 Abu Yedda, 10th century Berber leader
Aksel, Berber freedom fighter against the Arab raids and invasions who killed Uqba ibn Nafi
Muhammad ibn Wasul, Midrarid emir of Sijilmasa.
Safiyy al-Dawla, Fatimid governor of Aleppo between October 1022 and April 1023
 Lucius Septimius Severus
Thu'ban ibn Muhammad, Fatimid governor of Aleppo between 27 July 1024 and 30 June 1025
Ziri ibn Manad, founder of the Zirid dynasty
 Yusuf ibn Tashfin, founder of the Almoravid dynasty
Zaynab an-Nafzawiyyah, Berber woman of influence in the early days of the Almoravid Berber empire
Fannu (died April 1147), Almoravid princess, in the guise of a man, she participated in the defense of Almoravid Marrakech.
'Abdallah ibn Ghaniya, Amir of Majorca from c. 1187 to 1203
Abd al-Mu'min (c. 1094–1163), first Caliph of the Almohad Empire
 Abu Yaqub Yusuf, had the Giralda in Seville built
Yusuf II, Almohad caliph, had the Torre del Oro in Seville built
Abu Zakariya Yahya, founder and first sultan of the Hafsid dynasty.
Abu Said Uthman III, Marinid ruler of Morocco from 19 March 1398 to 1420
Buluggin ibn Ziri, Zirid ruler who founded the cities of Algiers, Médéa and Miliana.
Badis Ibn Habus, defeated the Abbadids of Seville one of the strongest taifas and also defeated the taifa of Almeria and took control of its territory. He also defeated the Hammudids and conquered the Taifa of Malaga.

Military

Antiquity 

Aedemon, led a revolt against Romans after the assassination of King Ptolemy of Mauretania in 40 AD
Tacfarinas, fought the Romans in the Aures Mountains
Firmus, fought the Romans Between 372 and 375
Cutzinas (died January 563), Berber tribal leader who played a major role in the wars of the Byzantine Empire against the Berber tribes in Africa
Antalas (born c. 500), tribal leader who played a major role in the wars of the Byzantine Empire against the Berber tribes in Africa.
Ierna, tribal leader of the Laguatan and also high priest of the god Gurzil
Lusius Quietus, Roman general and governor of Judaea who conquered several cities in the middle east, as well as destroying the Jewish rebels of Judaea
Quintus Lollius Urbicus, governor of Britain and conquered Scotland, he also built the Antonine Wall

Medieval period 

Dihya, Berber queen and military leader who defeated many Arab invaders and raiders
Aksel, Berber freedom fighter and prevented many Arab raids, he also killed the famous Arab general, Uqba ibn Nafi
Tariq ibn Ziyad (670–720), led the Islamic Umayyad conquest of Visigothic Hispania (711–718)
Khalid ibn Hamid al-Zanati, Berber general who led the Berber revolt against the Umayyads and killed Umayyad governor Kulthum ibn Iyadh al-Kushayri and umayyad general Habib ibn Abi Ubaida al-Fihri on the way to freeing modern day Morocco and Algeria from Arab rule.
Ali ibn Ja'far ibn Fallah, Fatimid commander and governor who defeated Umayyad commander Abu Rakwa (who nearly conquered Egypt) he also saved many parts of the middle east from the huge Bedouin army under Mufarrij ibn Daghfal ibn al-Jarrah
Ja'far ibn Fallah (died August 971), Berber general of the Kutama tribe in the service of the Fatimid Caliphate. Who defeated the Qarmatians from Syria
Ziri ibn Atiyya, leader of the Zenata Maghrawa who conquered many cities in Maghreb, he also found the city of Oujda
Mazdali ibn Tilankan, Almoravid military commander and diplomat
Syr ibn Abi Bakr, Almoravid military commander
Ibn Masal, military commander and official of the Fatimid Caliphate.
Hammu ibn Abd al-Haqq, Marinid prince Commander (shaykh al-ghuzat) of the Volunteers of the Faith of Granada
Uthman ibn Abi al-Ula, Marinid prince Commander (shaykh al-ghuzat) of the Volunteers of the Faith of Granada

Modern period 

 Abd el-Krim, leader of the Rif guerrillas against the Spanish and French colonizers
 Larbi Ben M'Hidi
Abdelhafid Boussouf, founder of the Algerian Military intelligence
Mustapha Benboulaïd
Abane Ramdane, Algerian revolutionary fighter, assassinated in 1957 in an internal purge.
Krim Belkacem, Algerian revolutionary fighter, assassinated in 1970, allegedly by Algerian secret services.
Colonel Amirouche, Algerian revolutionary fighter, killed by French troops in 1959.
 Lalla Fatma n Soumer, woman who led western Kabylie in battle against French troops.
Belkacem Radjef, early leading figure of the movement for independence.
Mohammed Ameziane, leader of the Moroccan Riffian resistance against the Spanish occupation of Northern Morocco.
Mulai Ahmed er Raisuni, leader of the Jebala tribal confederacy in Morocco
Mouha ou Hammou Zayani, Moroccan Berber military figure and tribal leader
Moha ou Said, Moroccan tribal leader who opposed French rule of the protectorate of Morocco.
Abdellah Zakour, Moroccan Soussi Berber military leader who opposed the French conquest of Morocco

Art

Writers and poets

Ancient period 

Terence, (Publius Terentius Afer), Roman writer
Apuleius, (125–170), born in Madaurus (M'Daourouch), philosopher and rhetorician; wrote the only Latin novel to survive in its entirety
Corippus, late Berber-Roman epic poet of the 6th century
Cresconius Africanus, Latin canon lawyer, possibly a Christian bishop in the African Church

Medieval period 

 Ibn Darraj al-Qastalli (958–1030), Andalusi poet of Berber origin
 Hafsa bint al-Hajj al-Rukuniyya (born c. 1135, died AH 1190–91), one of the most celebrated Andalusian female poets of medieval Arabic literature
Ibn Muti al-Zawawi (1168/69–1231), grammarian and poet
 Al-Busiri (1211–1294), Sufi poet
Mohammed Awzal (ca. 1680–1749), prolific Sous Berber poet

Modern period 

 Fadhma Aït Mansour, Algerian poet and folksinger. Mother of Jean Amrouche and Taos Amrouche
 Taos Amrouche (4 March 1913 – 2 April 1976), Algerian writer and singer
Jean Amrouche (7 February 1906 – 16 April 1962), Algerian writer and Taos Amrouche's brother
Nadia Chafik (born 1962), Moroccan novelist
Mohamed Chafik (born 17 September 1926), Moroccan writer and the dean of the IRCAM.
Mohamed Choukri, Moroccan writer
Mouloud Kacem Naît Belkacem writer and defender of the Arab language in Algeria
Mouloud Feraoun, writer assassinated by the OAS
Assia Djebar, Algerian novelist, translator and filmmaker
Tahar Djaout, writer and journalisbet assassinated by the GIA in 1993
Hawad (born 1950), Tuareg poet and author
Issouf ag Maha Nigerien Tuareg writer
Kateb Yacine, Algerian writer
Mohammed Khaïr-Eddine, Moroccan poet and novelist
Ali Lmrabet, Moroccan journalist
Ahmed Sefrioui, Moroccan novelist and pioneer of Moroccan literature in the French language
Tahar Ouettar
Si Mohand, Kabyle folk poet

Music

Singers 

Loreen, singer
Dania Ben Sassi, Libyan-Serbian singer
Amel Brahim-Djelloul, Algerian opera singer
Ammouri Mbarek, Moroccan singer-songwriter
Fatima Tabaamrant, Moroccan singer
Najat Aatabou, Moroccan singer
Hindi Zahra, Moroccan singer
Chérifa, Algerian singer
Mohamed Rouicha, Moroccan singer
Lounès Matoub, Algerian Berberist and secularist singer assassinated in 1998
Takfarinas, Algerian singer
Idir, Algerian singer
Katchou, Algerian singer
Lounis Aït Menguellet, Algerian singer
Slimane Azem, Algerian singer
Souad Massi, Algerian singer
El Hadj M'Hamed El Anka Algerian chaabi singer
Rim'K, rapper
Taos Amrouche, Algerian writer and singer
Aïssa Djermouni, Chaoui folk poet
Cheikh El Hasnaoui, Algerian singer
Lhaj Belaid, Moroccan singer and poet

Composers 

 Cheb i Sabbah, DJ and composer in Algeria

Bands 

Oudaden, Moroccan band
Tinariwen, Tuareg band
Izenzaren, Moroccan band

Performing Arts

Actors 

Erika Sawajiri, Japanese actress, Japanese, Algerian mix
Isabelle Adjani, French actress and singer of Kabyle descent
Saïd Taghmaoui, French-American actor and screenwriter of Moroccan descent
Sofia Boutella, Algerian actress, model and dancer
El Hedi ben Salem, Moroccan Berber actor known for his work with German director Rainer Werner Fassbinder

Film directors 

Bachir Bensaddek, Canadian director

Dancers 

 Kamel Ouali, choreographer, dance teacher, teacher on the French reality TV show Star Academy France

Academic sciences

Linguistics and philology

Medieval times 

 Abu Hayyan al-Gharnati, commentator on the Quran and foremost Arabic grammarian of his era
Abu Musa al-Jazuli, philologian and grammarian
 Ibn Adjurrum, famous grammarian of Arabic

Modern times 

 Saïd Cid Kaoui, Algerian berberologist and lexicographer
 Boulifa, Algerian Berberologist and teacher
 Salem Chaker, Algerian Berberologist and director of Berber at the Institut National des Langues et Civilisations Orientales in Paris. He is recognized as the "dean" of modern Berber studies
 Mouloud Mammeri, writer, anthropologist and linguist.
 Abdellah Bounfour, Moroccan linguist and philologist

History

Medieval period 

 Mohammed al-Baydhaq, chronicler of the Almohads
 Ibn Amira, historian, poet, and scholar of law from al-Andalus
 Ibn Ghazi al-Miknasi, Moroccan historian, poet, and scholar of law from al-Andalus
 Ibn Hammad, medieval Berber qadi and historian
 Abd al-Aziz ibn Shaddad, Zirid chronicler
 Abu al-Hasan Ali al-Jaznai

Modern period 

 Mohammed Akensus (1797–1877)
 Ahmad Ibn al-Qadi (December 18, 1552 – December 6, 1616)
 Mohammed al-Ifrani (1670–1747)
 Abu al-Qasim al-Zayyani (1734/35–1833), Moroccan historian, geographer, poet and statesman
 Ali Azayku (1942–2004)
 Abdelaziz al-Malzuzi
 Mohammed al-Mokhtar Soussi
 Mohamed Salah Mzali
 Mohammed Arkoun, Algerian historian of Islamic thought

Science 

 Abbas ibn Firnas, polymath
 Ibn al-Yasamin, Berber mathematician
 Mustapha Ishak Boushaki, Berber cosmologist

Religion

Christians

 Tertullian, early Christian author
Pope Victor I, pope of the Roman Catholic Church (reigned 189–199)
Saint Cyprian of Carthage, bishop of Carthage and martyr (b. 200–210, d. 258)
Pope Miltiades, pope of the Roman Catholic Church (reigned 311–314)
Pope Gelasius I, pope of the Roman Catholic Church (reigned 492–496)
Saint Monica of Hippo (Thagaste/Souk Ahras), (322–387), Saint Augustine's mother
Saint Alypius, (360–430) from Thagaste, bishop of Thagaste (394)
Faustus of Mileve, from Milevis, bishop of Milevis (Mila) late 4th century
Saint Augustine of Hippo, (354–430), from Thagaste (Souk Ahras), bishop of Hippo Regius (Annaba) (395)
Arius, proposed the doctrine of Arianism
 Donatus Magnus, leader of the Donatist schism
 Adrian of Canterbury, Abbot of St Augustine's Abbey in Canterbury

Muslims 

 Abdallah ibn Yasin, spiritual leader of the Almoravid movement.
 Ibn Tumart, founder of the Almohad dynasty
 Muhammad al-Jazuli, author of the Dala'il al-Khairat, Sufi
 Muhammad al-Maghili, Berber 'alim from Tlemcen

Other 

 Salih ibn Tarif of the Berghouata

Law 

 Ahmad ibn Abi Jum'ah, Maliki scholar of Islamic law
 Mundhir ibn Sa'īd al-Ballūṭī, judge for the Caliph of Cordoba
 Ahmad al-Wansharisi, Muslim theologian and jurist of the Maliki school
 Ibn Arafa
Abu al-Hassan Ali ibn Mohammed al-Zarwili, qadi of Taza and later qadi of Fez.

Travel

Ibn Battuta (1304–1377), Moroccan traveller and explorer
Leo Africanus (c. 1494 – c. 1554), Berber Andalusi diplomat and travel writer
Estevanico (1500–1539), Moroccan explorer, who became the first North African of Berber origin to explore North America

Politics

Politicians
Thami El Glaoui, Pasha of Marrakesh 1912–1956
Mohand Arav Bessaoud, Algerian writer and activist. He was described as the spiritual father of Berberism.
Saïd Sadi, secularist politician
Belkacem Radjef (1909–1989), politician; co-founder Etoile Nord-Africaine (1933); founder of Secours National Algerien (1962).
Hocine Aït Ahmed, Algerian revolutionary fighter and secularist politician
Sidi Said, leader of the Algerian syndicate of workers : UGTA
Khalida Toumi, Algerian feminist and secularist, currently spokesperson for the Algerian government
Ahmed Ouyahia, Prime Minister of Algeria
Belaïd Abrika, one of the spokesmen of the Arouch
Saadeddine Othmani, deputy of Inezgane, an outer suburb of Agadir, is the leader of the Justice and Development Party (Islamist) and head of the Moroccan government.
Liamine Zeroual and Houari Boumedienne, former Presidents of Algeria
Nouri Abusahmain, President of the Libyan General National Congress
Mohamed Seghir Boushaki
Liamine Zéroual, President of Algeria between 1994 and 1999
Hamid Algabid, Prime Minister of Niger 1983–1988 and Secretary General of the OIC 1989–1996
Abdelmadjid Tebboune, President of Algeria

Sport
 Adam Ounas, French footballer of Algerian descent
 Amine Adli
 Amine Harit, Moroccan footballer
 Achraf Hakimi, Spanish footballer of Moroccan descent
 Abdelhamid Sabiri
 Aymen Abdennour
 Bouchaib El Moubarki
 Faouzi Chaouchi
 Habib Bellaïd, French footballer of Algerian descent
 Houssem Aouar, French footballer of Moroccan descent
 Ismaël Bennacer, French footballer of Moroccan descent
 Karim Ziani, French footballer of Algerian descent
Mounir Chouiar, French footballer of Moroccan descent
Rabah Madjer, Algerian footballer, winner of the 1986–87 European Cup with FC Porto
Zinedine Zidane, French footballer and manager of Real Madrid
Karim Benzema, French-Algerian footballer
 Karim Bridji, Dutch-Algerian footballer
Madjid Bougherra, French-Algerian footballer
Mustapha Hadji, Moroccan footballer nominated as the best African player of the year 1998
 Nadir Belhadj, French-Algerian footballer
 Younes Belhanda, Moroccan footballer
Youssouf Hadji, Moroccan footballer
 Karim Rekik
 Karim Soltani
 Kévin Malcuit, French footballer of Moroccan descent
 Samir Malcuit, French footballer of Moroccan descent
Khalid Boulahrouz, Dutch footballer of Moroccan descent
Ibrahim Afellay, Dutch footballer of Moroccan origin
Riyad Mahrez, Algerian footballer won the English Premier League with Leicester City
Islam Slimani, Algerian footballer
 Ismaël Gharbi
Adel Taarabt, Moroccan footballer
Hakim Ziyech, Moroccan footballer
Oussama Assaidi, Moroccan footballer
Zakaria Labyad, Moroccan footballer
Abdeslam Ouaddou, Moroccan footballer
Youssef Mokhtari, Moroccan footballer
Munir El Haddadi, Spanish-Moroccan footballer
Samir Nasri, French-Algerian footballer
Nordin Amrabat, Moroccan footballer
Sofyan Amrabat, Moroccan footballer
Yassine Bounou
Yasser Larouci
Badr Hari, Moroccan kick-boxer and K-1 legend from Souss
Kylian Mbappé, French footballer of Algerian Kabyle descent
 Fouad Idabdelhay
 Rayan Aït-Nouri
 Simo
 Mehdy Guezoui
 Mohcine Nader
 Nabil El Zhar
 Nader Matar
 Nassim Ben Khalifa
 Omar El Kaddouri
 Saïd Benrahma
 Yacine Adli
 Yazid Mansouri
 Youssef En-Nesyri
 Yuri Berchiche, Spanish Footballer of Algerian descent
 Zinédine Machach, French-Algerian Footballer

References

Berbers